The surname Belton may refer to:

Alexis Belton (born 1993), American  golfer, long drive champion
Andrew Belton (1882–1970), British Army officer
Betty Belton (1916–1989), English cricketer
Bill Belton, American footballer
Catherine Belton, journalist, Moscow correspondent for the Financial Times
Cathy Belton, Irish actress
Charles Belton (1820–1891), English cricketer
Claire Belton, American illustrator, created cartoon cat Pusheen
Christopher Belton (born 1955), British writer
Dane Belton (born 1999), American football player
Daniel Belton (born 1970), New Zealand dancer
Danielle Belton, American editor-in-chief of HuffPost
Dave Belton (born 1964), American politician
David Belton, director, writer, and film producer
Don Belton (1956–2009), openly gay African-American author
Horace Belton (1955–2019), American football player
Howard Belton (1893–1988), Oregon, US, farmer and politician
Jack Belton (died 1963), Irish politician, builder and publican
Jackie Belton (1895–1952), English footballer
James Belton (1855–1935), Australian politician
 Janine Belton, English swimmer
 John Belton (academic), Professor Emeritus of English and Film at Rutgers University
 John Aloysius Belton (1903–1968), Irish diplomat
 Keith Belton (born 1981), American footballer
 Kevin Belton (born c. 1960), American chef, television presenter, author and educator
 Kim Belton (born 1958), American sports producer, former basketball player
 Louis Belton (born 1943), Irish Fine Gael politician
 Luke Belton (1918–2006), Irish Fine Gael politician
 Michael J. Belton, American astronomer
 Paddy Belton (1926–1987), Irish politician, company director and publican
 Patrick Belton (1885–1945), Irish politician, leader of the Irish Christian Front
 Ray Belton, American academic administrator
 Richard Belton (1913–1974), Irish politician
 Robyn Belton, New Zealand illustrator of children's books
 Roy Belton (1900 or 1901–1920), lynched white American murder suspect
 Sharon Sayles Belton (born 1951), American community leader, politician and activist
 Tracy Belton (born 1984), American football defensive back
 Willie Belton (1948–1992), American football running back

See also
Belton Richard